The women's 400 metre freestyle S9 event at the 2016 Paralympic Games took place on 9 September 2016, at the Olympic Aquatics Stadium. Three heats were held. The swimmers with the eight fastest times advanced to the final.

Heats

Heat 1 
10:57 9 September 2016:

Heat 2 
11:04 9 September 2016:

Heat 3 
11:12 9 September 2016:

Final 
19:51 9 September 2016:

Notes

Swimming at the 2016 Summer Paralympics